César Valdés (born 26 April 1942) is a Cuban basketball player. He competed in the men's tournament at the 1968 Summer Olympics.

References

1942 births
Living people
Cuban men's basketball players
Olympic basketball players of Cuba
Basketball players at the 1968 Summer Olympics
People from Pinar del Río Province